The 1974 USC Trojans football team represented the University of Southern California (USC) in the 1974 NCAA Division I football season. In their 15th year under head coach John McKay, the Trojans compiled a 10–1–1 record (6–0–1 against conference opponents), finished in first place in the Pacific-8 Conference (Pac-8), and outscored their opponents by a combined total of 363 to 142. The team was ranked #1 in the final UPI Coaches Poll and #2 in the final AP Poll.

Quarterback Pat Haden led the team in passing, completing 70 of 149 passes for 988 yards with 13 touchdowns and 11 interceptions.  Anthony Davis led the team in rushing with 301 carries for 1,421 yards and 13 touchdowns. J.K. McKay led the team in receiving with 34 catches for 550 yards and eight touchdowns. Vince Evans backed up Haden. Allen Carter backed up Davis. The fullbacks were Ricky Bell, Dave Farmer and Mosi Tatupu. The starting flanker, Shelton Diggs, caught the two point conversion that lifted USC over Ohio State in the January 1975 Rose Bowl.

Schedule

Roster

Game summaries

Washington

References

External links
 Game program: USC vs. Washington at Spokane – October 12, 1974

USC
USC Trojans football seasons
College football national champions
Pac-12 Conference football champion seasons
Rose Bowl champion seasons
USC Trojans football